Brown salwood is a common name for several plants and may refer to:
 Acacia aulacocarpa
 Acacia crassicarpa